Lahayville is a commune in the Meuse department in Grand Est in north-eastern France.

Geography
The village lies on the right bank of the Rupt de Mad, which flows northeastward through the south-eastern part of the commune.

See also
Communes of the Meuse department
Parc naturel régional de Lorraine

References

Communes of Meuse (department)